Damon Quinn (born 12 April 1964) is a Northern Irish actor, writer and producer.  He is a member of the Hole in the Wall Gang comedy group. Quinn also produced "The Crush" a short film nominated for an Academy award (Best Live-action short) in 2011.

He is best known for the Northern Irish television comedy Give My Head Peace where he stars as Cal. He also appears in the comedy Dry Your Eyes as many characters including Angry Steve. Despite his comedy background, Quinn is a keen historian.

References

1964 births
Living people
Male television actors from Northern Ireland
Comedy writers from Northern Ireland